Sulfurovum lithotrophicum is a species of bacteria, the type species of its genus. It is a sulfur-oxidizing chemolithoautotroph within the ε-Proteobacteria isolated from Okinawa Trough hydrothermal sediments. It is mesophilic and also oxidises thiosulfate. It is a Gram-negative, non-motile and coccoid to oval-shaped bacterium. The type strain is 42BKTT (=ATCC BAA-797T =JCM 12117T).

References

Further reading

Voordeckers, James Walter. Physiology and Molecular Ecology of Chemolithoautotrophic Nitrate Reducing Bacteria at Deep Sea Hydrothermal Vents. ProQuest, 2007.

External links
LPSN
Type strain of Sulfurovum lithotrophicum at BacDive -  the Bacterial Diversity Metadatabase

Campylobacterota
Bacteria described in 2004